Dennis Andries MBE (born 5 November 1953) is a British former professional boxer who fought at light heavyweight.

Professional career

Andries turned pro in 1978 and won the WBC Light Heavyweight Title in 1986 in a decision over American JB Williamson.  He defended the title once against fellow Briton Tony Sibson before losing the belt in 1987 to Thomas Hearns. In 1989 he re-captured the Vacant WBC Light Heavyweight Title with a win over American Tony Willis, but lost the title in his first defence to Jeff Harding. In 1990 he won a rematch with Harding via 7th-round KO, recapturing the title. He made two further defences before in 1991 losing the title again to Harding, via majority decision, capping their trilogy. Dennis Andries, lost a WBA Cruiserweight final eliminator via 7th-round KO to David Pearce in 1982, although the BBBoC did not sanction the Cruiserweight division in the UK. Dennis Andries retired in 1996.

Professional boxing record

Honours
Andries was appointed the MBE in the 1991 Birthday Honours.

See also
List of world light-heavyweight boxing champions
List of British world boxing champions
List of outright winners of the Lonsdale belt

References

External links

 

 

|-

1953 births
Living people
Sportspeople from Georgetown, Guyana
Guyanese male boxers
Guyanese emigrants to England
English male boxers
Boxers from Greater London
Members of the Order of the British Empire
Cruiserweight boxers
World light-heavyweight boxing champions
British Boxing Board of Control champions
World Boxing Council champions